The 2007 Worcester City Council election took place on 3 May 2007 to elect members of Worcester City Council in Worcestershire, England. One third of the council was up for election and the Conservative Party stayed in overall control of the council.

After the election, the composition of the council was:
Conservative 18
Labour 12
Liberal Democrat 3
Independent 2

Campaign
Before the election the Conservatives controlled the council with 18 seats, while Labour had 11 and the Liberal Democrats and independents had 3 seats each. 44 candidates stood in the election for the 11 seats which were being contested.

The campaign saw controversy over the Conservative candidate in Arboretum ward, Melanie Heider, after it came out that she was a member of the United Kingdom Independence Party (UKIP) as well as the Conservatives. When this became public it was announced that she had resigned her membership of UKIP, but Labour called on her to be sacked as a candidate.

Election result
The results saw the Conservatives keep their majority on the council after holding all 7 seats which they had been defending. Meanwhile, Labour gained one seat in Nunnery ward from an independent to have 12 councillors after the election.

Ward results

References

2007 English local elections
2007
2000s in Worcestershire